Victoria Square is a small, rectangular garden square 50 metres south of the remaining stables of The Royal Mews (on the large green block taken up by Buckingham Palace) and 150 metres north of Victoria bus station (which stands in front of Victoria Station (London)).  It has a statue of the young Queen Victoria.

It separated by the main wing of the Goring Hotel from an almost identical-size space between buildings, as private gardens for the hotel, backed by one road, instead of its four private close-style roads with parking and sets of pavements.

Most of the Victoria and Belgravia area is the Duke of Westminster's Grosvenor Estate as to minor, overarching legal interests, the more valuable freehold of let shops and as to open spaces; this square is such an instance, which has a lasting influence on local planning policy and which has had some loss of interest by outright sales, some of which facilitated by leasehold reform under the Leasehold Reform Act 1967.

Architecture and history
Fronting the square are 26 houses, which are all Grade II* listed which is the second tier (and so second-rarest) of the pyramidal-hierarchy  protection and recognition system. These are five-storey stucco-fronted properties designed by architect Sir Matthew Wyatt (1805–1886), a member of the Wyatt family — son of sculptor Matthew Cotes Wyatt and the grandson of James Wyatt; seeing them built in 1838–40 to celebrate the beginning of Queen Victoria's reign.

Most of the houses fronting are now held as freeholds, the residual interest in their leases (reversions) having been bought from the Grosvenor Estate.  Protection of planning law of character in this zone has been strengthened to preserve the appearance of Belgravia.

Renovation
The private gardens were in the 2000s decade renovated; for which residents gave between £100,000 and £1M in total. A statue of the young Queen Victoria by the artist Catherine Anne Laugel was specially commissioned then installed, in 2007.

Former residents
 Author Ian Fleming (1908–1964) from 1953 until his death in 1964.  The first of his James Bond novels, Casino Royale, was published shortly after he took his house, where he threw a post-premiere of From Russia with Love party on 10 October 1963 - at No. 16.
Conservative Government Minister, then journalist, author and travel journalist, Michael Portillo (born 1953).
Poet Thomas Campbell (1777–1844) from 1840 to 1844 - at No. 16.
Musician John Ella (1802–1888) from 1868 to 1888 - at No. 16.
Army officer, artist and author Henry Hope Crealock (1831–1891) from the 1860s until 1891- at No. 20
Musician and composer Mike Oldfield for some time - at No. 1.

Appearance in film
In 1991, the square was used for the filming of the Merchant Ivory Productions adaptation Howards End.

Notes and references

Footnotes

References

1830s establishments in England
Squares in the City of Westminster
Grade II* listed buildings in the City of Westminster
Monuments and memorials to Queen Victoria
Grade II* listed houses in London